Soft Effects is the second EP by the indie rock band Spoon. It was released on January 21, 1997, by Matador, then re-released with Telephono in 2006 by Merge Records.

Track listing
 "Mountain to Sound" – 3:50
 "Waiting for the Kid to Come Out" – 2:40
 "I Could See the Dude" – 1:59
 "Get Out the State" – 2:50
 "Loss Leaders" – 3:30

Personnel
Scott Adair – bass guitar
John Croslin – bass guitar
Britt Daniel – vocals, guitar
Jim Eno – drums
Brad Shenfeld - dabouke

References

1997 EPs
Spoon (band) albums
Matador Records EPs
Merge Records EPs